Cresera ilioides is a moth of the family Erebidae first described by William Schaus in 1905. It is found in French Guiana, Guyana, Venezuela, Peru and Bolivia.

References

Moths described in 1905
Phaegopterina